The 1986–87 I-Divisioona season was the 13th season of the I-Divisioona, the second level of Finnish ice hockey. 12 teams participated in the league, and KooKoo won the championship. KooKoo, TuTo Hockey, HPK Hämeenlinna, and JoKP Joensuu qualified for the promotion/relegation round of the SM-liiga.

Regular season

External links
 Season on hockeyarchives.info

2
Fin
I-Divisioona seasons